Andrey Gorokhov (born 29 June 1968) is a Russian bobsledder. He competed at the 1992 Winter Olympics and the 1994 Winter Olympics.

References

External links
 

1968 births
Living people
Russian male bobsledders
Olympic bobsledders of Russia
Olympic bobsledders of the Unified Team
Bobsledders at the 1992 Winter Olympics
Bobsledders at the 1994 Winter Olympics
Place of birth missing (living people)